Amberboa is a genus of flowering plants in the family Asteraceae, described as a genus in 1832.

Species in this genus are native to central and southwestern Asia.

Species

 Amberboa amberboi (L.) Tzvelev - Turkmenistan, Kazakhstan, Uzbekistan, Iran, Armenia
 Amberboa bucharica Iljin - Turkmenistan, Kazakhstan, Uzbekistan, Tajikistan, Kyrgyzstan, Afghanistan, Iran
 Amberboa glauca (Puschk. ex Willd.) Muss.Puschk. ex Grossh. - Caucasus, Iran, Turkey
 Amberboa moschata (L.) DC. - Caucasus, Turkey, Iran, Iraq
 Amberboa nana (Boiss.) Iljin - Altai, Caucasus, Turkey, Iran, Iraq, Lebanon, Syria, Kazakhstan
 Amberboa odorata (Cass.) DC.
 Amberboa ramosa (Roxb.) Jafri - India, Pakistan, Afghanistan
 Amberboa sosnovskyi Iljin - Caucasus, Iran
 Amberboa turanica Iljin - Russia, Caucasus, Iran, Central Asia, Xinjiang, Pakistan, Afghanistan

References

Cynareae
Asteraceae genera